The FIFA World Cup is an international association football competition contested by the men's national teams of the members of Fédération Internationale de Football Association (FIFA), the sport's global governing body. The championship has been awarded every four years since the first tournament in 1930, except in 1942 and 1946, due to World War II.

The tournament consists of two parts, the qualification phase and the final phase (officially called the World Cup Finals). The qualification phase, which currently take place over the three years preceding the Finals, is used to determine which teams qualify for the Finals. The current format of the finals involves 32 teams competing for the title, at venues within the host nation nations) over a period of about a month. The World Cup Finals is the most widely viewed sporting event in the world, with an estimated 715.1 million people watching the 2006 tournament final.

Portugal have qualified for the final phase of the FIFA World Cup on eight occasions: in 1966, 1986, 2002 and every final phase held since. Their best performance, as of 2022, is the third place in 1966; they also finished fourth in 2006.

Overall record

Note: Draws include knockout matches decided via penalty shoot-out.

Matches

Record players

Top goalscorers

Eusebio's nine goals at the 1966 FIFA World Cup made him that tournament's top goalscorer, which also won him the Bronze Ball.

See also
 Portugal at the UEFA European Championship

References

External links
Portugal at FIFA
World Cup Finals Statistics

 
Countries at the FIFA World Cup